High on the Hog is the second studio album of American country music singer Kevin Fowler. It was released on August 6, 2002 as his second album for the independent Tin Roof label.

Track listing
All songs written by Kevin Fowler, unless noted otherwise.
"There's a Fool Born Everyday" — 4:05
"Senorita Mas Fina" (Fowler, Clay Blaker) — 3:21
"Not Lovin' Anymore" — 4:30
"The Lord Loves the Drinkin' Man" — 4:37
"A Fool and His Heart" — 3:45
"Our Love is a Prison" (Fowler, Jay Lamb, John Owens) — 3:44
"She Ain't Bad But She Ain't You" — 3:54
"Tall Drink of Water" — 2:50
"High on the Hog" — 4:06
"All the Tequila in Tijuana" — 3:44
"Ol' What's Her Name" — 3:46
"Fat Bottomed Girls" (Brian May) — 4:31

Chart performance

References

2002 albums
Kevin Fowler albums